Tor Morisse (10 July 1947 – 17 May 2017) was a Norwegian illustrator, children's writer and comics creator.
 
Morisse was raised in Oslo and was a brother of  musician Bjørn Morisse. For many years he lived and worked in Sweden. He illustrated more than 300 books, especially children's books, by authors including Lennart Hellsing, Hans Pettersson,  Bjørn Rønningen and Frid Ingulstad. His first drawings were published in Kamratposten during 1976. In 1986. he started his own publishing house. In 2002, he received the  Publicistklubben's Gold Pen (Årets Gullpenn).  His comics album from 2007, based on the fairy tale The Giant Who Had No Heart in His Body, was nominated for the Sproing Award.

References

1947 births
2017 deaths
Norwegian children's writers
Comics creators from Oslo
Norwegian illustrators
Norwegian expatriates in Sweden